Busjin (also Romanized as Būsjīn; also known as Pūsjīn) is a village in Mehmandust Rural District of Kuraim District, Nir County, Ardabil province, Iran. At the 2006 census, its population was 629 in 139 households. The following census in 2011 counted 653 people in 202 households. The latest census in 2016 showed a population of 524 people in 143 households; it was the largest village in its rural district.

References 

Nir County

Towns and villages in Nir County

Populated places in Ardabil Province

Populated places in Nir County